Oakfield Township is one of twelve townships in Audubon County, Iowa, United States. As of the 2010 census, its population was 314.

History
Oakfield Township was organized in 1874. It is named after Oakfield, New York, the former home of an early settler.

Geography
According to the USGS, it contains three cemeteries: Oak Hill, Oakfield and Saint Johns.

References

External links
 US-Counties.com
 City-Data.com

Townships in Audubon County, Iowa
Townships in Iowa
1874 establishments in Iowa
Populated places established in 1874